First Invasion: The War of 1812 is a documentary produced by the History Channel which aired on September 11, 2004. The film was about the American War of 1812, when the Americans fought the British for the first time since the American Revolutionary War.

Reception 
The film was nominated for an Emmy for Outstanding Art Direction for a Variety, Music Program or Special in 2005.

Sources
 The History Channel website www.historychannel.com
 1812 link

References

See also
 War of 1812

History (American TV channel) original programming
War of 1812 films
2004 films